Liska March (February 17, 1906 – May 30, 2003) was a dancer in the Ziegfeld Follies, an actress
in motion pictures of the early sound era, and a producer of Broadway plays. March was born in St. Louis, Missouri and played in stock there prior to going to New York, New York. While in New York City Liska appeared in the Follies and also took part in Sunny, a play which featured actress Marilyn Miller. She died in 2003 at the age of 97.

Career
She came to Hollywood, California to act in films in April 1929. Her first movie appearance was a role in support of Eddie Leonard in the Universal Pictures production, Melody Lane. She was in the cast of Koffer des Herrn O.F..Die (1931), aka The Trunks of Mr. O.F.. She once told a reporter that she never wanted a voice double in her film roles, commenting Wouldn't it be quite annoying if your voice would refuse to renew its contract and you would have to scurry around and find another one like it?

One of a select group of non-performers (or in her case, ex-performers) awarded membership in The Actors Studio, March was an associate producer of two original plays on Broadway during the 1950s. School For Scandal was the third production in a series presented by Terese Hayden. This was an 18th-century comedy which opened in June 1953 at the Theatre de Lys. Patricia Neal starred as Lady Teazle. Liska helped present The Genius and the Goddess, a 1957 Broadway play. Among the actors involved was child star Nancy Kelly. The setting for this one was a St. Louis living room in the years 1921 and 1922.

Miss March played a Sister of Mercy in The Ballad of Joe Hill (1971). She was among those who presented the movie at the Cannes Film Festival.

Selected filmography
 The Trunks of Mr. O.F. (1931)

Citations

References

Festival De Cannes homepage, Films Presented in Cannes, Joe Hill.
Internet Broadway Database, The Genius and the Goddess.
Los Angeles Times, Liska March Doesn't Want Voice Double, May 12, 1929, Page 20.
Los Angeles Times, Liska March In It, May 21, 1929, Page A10.
New York Times, Sheridan Comedy A Revival Tonight, June 23, 1953, Page 26.

External links

American female dancers
American film actresses
20th-century American actresses
March Liska
2003 deaths
1906 births
20th-century American dancers
21st-century American women